Russian Aquaculture PJSC is a Russia's largest fish farming company. It operates fish farms and market chilled and frozen salmon and trout. Russian Aquaculture farms salmon and trout on the lakes in Karelia and in the Barents and White Seas.

History
The company was founded in 1997 as a reseller of Norwegian fish to Russia. Its previous name was "Russian Sea". In 2007 it commenced independent fish aquaculture and now operates in domestic and export markets. In 2010 the company listed, with an IPO on Moscow Stock Exchange.

In 2013, the company divested its finished products unit. In 2015, Russian Sea changed its name to Russian Aquaculture. The company sold its holding in the Russian Fish Company in 2016 to a group of investors, retaining its interests in salmon and trout aquaculture. In July and October 2017, the company invested in hatcheries in Norway (Villa Smolt AS and Olden Oppdrettsanlegg AS). In that year, the company also raised over RUB 1bn ($17M) through a secondary public offering (SPO) co-run by two Russian banks, Gazprombank and Otkritie.

In 2018, the company invested RUB2.5 billion (US$40 million) in the construction of a new smolt production facility in Murmansk Oblast.

In 2019 the company reported that their salmon production had grown by three times, and output reached 18 000 tonnes. 

As of 2020 the company owns farming licenses for 36 sites with a total potential for annual production of around 50,000 tonnes of salmonids per year.

At the end of 2020, Russian Aquaculture was listed on the Top-10 listing of the most effective Russian investing companies by the NKR credit rating agency. 

In March 2021, the company successfully placed three-year bonds totaling EUR 33 million with an annual coupon rate of 9.5%.

By the end of Q1 2021, the company reported increased production volumes, with sales totaling 7,800 tonnes. This represents a 28% increase compared to the same period during 2020.

Business operations
Russian Aquaculture's business consists of two operations: the cultivation of rainbow trout in the Republic of Karelia and the cultivation of Atlantic salmon and sea trout in the Murmansk region.

Shareholders 
Key shareholders as of December 31, 2020:

 47,67% — Maxim Vorobyev;
 24,99% — LLC UK Svinyin and partners;
 28,9% — owned by other shareholders; 
 2,33% — purchased by the Group.

Board Member — Maxim Vorobyev;

General Director — Ilya Sosnov.

As of June 30, 2021, the Company's capitalization reached 31.8 billion rubles.

References

Fish farming companies
Companies based in Murmansk Oblast